Alan James Dunne (born 23 August 1982) is a former Irish professional footballer who played as a right back. He is currently the first-team coach for  club Bromley. He played in the English Football League for Millwall and Leyton Orient as well as in non-league football for Bromley. Dunne has been married to his wife Aimee Dunne, since 2009, with whom he has had two children.

Early life
Dunne was born in Dublin, County Dublin.

Career
Dunne started his career with Millwall's youth system, before signing a professional contract in March 2000. He made his first-team debut on 19 March 2002 against Sheffield United. At the end of the 2009–10 season, Dunne was awarded Player of the Year. He was sent off a record ten times for Millwall and also received 85 yellow cards in his Millwall career. Dunne was released by Millwall at the end of the 2014–15 season after 22 years at the club.

On 27 July 2015, Dunne signed for newly relegated League Two club Leyton Orient on a two-year contract. He left Orient by mutual consent on 18 January 2017.

On 20 January 2017, Dunne signed for National League club Bromley. He made his debut for the club in a 3–1 home victory over Southport on 28 January.

Career statistics

Honours
Bromley
FA Trophy runner-up: 2017–18

Individual
Millwall Player of the Year: 2009–10

References

External links

Profile at the Bromley F.C. website

1982 births
Living people
Association footballers from Dublin (city)
Republic of Ireland association footballers
Association football defenders
Millwall F.C. players
Leyton Orient F.C. players
Bromley F.C. players
English Football League players
National League (English football) players
Republic of Ireland expatriate association footballers
Expatriate footballers in England
Irish expatriate sportspeople in England